Hans Joachim Müller-Eberhard (May 5, 1927 – March 3, 1998) was a distinguished molecular immunologist who did pioneering research in the United States and his native Germany. The areas of investigation upon which he left his mark include the immunoglobulins and the complement system. Awarded the gold Robert Koch Prize in 1987. SSI Honorary Member (1973).

References

External links
 

1927 births
1998 deaths
German immunologists
German molecular biologists
American molecular biologists
American biochemists
American geneticists
American immunologists
University of Texas Health Science Center at Houston faculty